Matilda Getrude Robbins (1887 – January 9, 1963) was a Russian Empire-born American socialist labor organizer who first connected with the Industrial Workers of the World during the 1912 Bread and Roses strike in Lawrence, Massachusetts.

Early life
Tatiana Gitel Rabinowitz (According to the ship's manifest where names of entering immigrants are listed, Matilda's original given name was Taube (Yiddish or German for 'dove'; however, she claimed a Russian given name, Tanya.)was born in Lityn, Ukraine. She moved to New York with her family at age 13, in 1900. Her name was anglicized to Matilda Gertrude Robbins in the process of immigration.

Career

Robbins started working as a teenager in a shirtwaist factory, and worked various jobs from age 16 onward. In Bridgeport, Connecticut she made her first connections to the Socialist Party and the Industrial Workers of the World (IWW). Robbins became a key organizer during a strike in Little Falls, New York, running the strike office, organizing a strike kitchen, raising money and legal aid, and fortifying the picket line over the course of fourteen weeks. Robbins and activist Elizabeth Gurley Flynn were then hired by the IWW and spent three years traveling across the United States to assist with labor organizing. She was one of only two women organizers for the IWW during its early years, along with Flynn.  She was arrested for her organizing work in East Liverpool, Ohio, in McKeesport, Pennsylvania, and in Detroit, Michigan, all in 1913. Later she was active in the IWW's Sacco-Vanzetti Defense Committee.

Robbins wrote for the IWW publications for many years after leaving active organizing, and she ran the Socialist Party's Los Angeles office from 1945 to 1947.

Personal life
Robbins had a longtime relationship with another labor organizer, Benjamin J. Legere (1887–1972). They were parents together of a daughter, Vita, born in 1919. Robbins died in 1963, aged 76 years, in Oakland, California. Her granddaughter Robbin Légère Henderson, an artist, prepared illustrations for the 2017 publication of Robbins's memoirs, from a manuscript written in the 1950s.

References

External links
 A photograph of Robbins probably taken at the time of her arrest in Detroit, Michigan in the 1910s; in the collection of the Walter P. Reuther Library, Wayne State University.
 The Ben Legere Papers are also held in the Walter P. Reuther Library, Wayne State University.

American socialists
Industrial Workers of the World leaders
Emigrants from the Russian Empire to the United States
1887 births
1963 deaths